Orano SA is a multinational nuclear fuel cycle company headquartered in Châtillon, Hauts-de-Seine, France. The company is engaged in uranium mining, conversion-enrichment, spent fuel recycling, nuclear logistics, dismantling, and nuclear cycle engineering activities. It was created in 2017 as a result of restructuring and recapitalizing of the nuclear conglomerate Areva. Orano is majority owned by the French state. , Orano is the second largest uranium producer in the world with 9% share in global uranium production.

Etymology
The name Orano is derived from Ouranos, the Greek god, and it refers to uranium. The company's circular yellow logo refers to yellowcake uranium concentrate and to the nuclear fuel cycle.

History

Orano dates back to 1976 when based on the production division of the French Alternative Energies and Atomic Energy Commission (CEA), the Compagnie générale des matières nucléaires (COGEMA, now Orano Cycle) was created. 

In 2016, due to financial difficulties, Areva initiated a restructuring process. As part of this, it created a new fuel cycle company, dubbed as New Co or New Areva. The new company combined Areva Mines, Areva NC, Areva Projects, and Areva Business Support companies. It was created as a wholly owned subsidiary of Areva; however, Areva lost control over the company as the French government invested to recapitalize the company. On 23 January 2018 the company changed its name to Orano. In February 2018, Japan Nuclear Fuel Limited and Mitsubishi Heavy Industries took 5% stakes in the company each.

In September 2018, the United States Nuclear Regulatory Commission terminated the license of Orano to construct the Eagle Rock Enrichment Facility, which was to be built in Bonneville County, Idaho. The project had been suspended since December 2011. At the same time Orano opened the Philippe Coste uranium conversion plant in France.

Operations
Orano is engaged in uranium mining, conversion and enrichment, spent fuel recycling, nuclear logistics, dismantling, and nuclear cycle engineering activities. Its main subsidiaries include Orano Cycle, COGEMA and Areva NC, which is active in all stages of the nuclear fuel cycle; Orano Mining, which is active in mining activities, including exploration, extraction, and processing of uranium ore, Orano Med which focuses on the development of therapies to fight cancer; Orano TN, which deals with the transport of nuclear materials; and Orano Projects, which is responsible for the fuel cycle engineering.

Mining

, Orano is the second largest uranium producer in the world with 9% share in global uranium production. Orano operates uranium production sites in Canada, Kazakhstan, and Niger. In Canada, its operations include interests in the McClean Lake uranium mill, Cigar Lake mine, McArthur River mine, and Key Lake uranium mill. In Kazakhstan, Orano has a joint venture with Kazatomprom named Katco. In addition, it owns the mothballed Trekkopje mine in Namibia, together with the Desalination Plant near Swakopmund. In Gabon, it owns the site of former Mounana uranium mine where mining activities were carried out between 1961 and 1999.

Processing
The conversion and enrichment operations are carried out in Malvési and Tricastin sites in France.

Transportation and storage
Nuclear material transport and storage services are provided through Orano TN subsidiary. In 2017 the NUHOMS Matrix advanced used nuclear fuel storage overpack, a high-density system for storing multiple spent fuel rods in canisters, was launched.

Recycling
Orano provides nuclear recycling activities at the La Hague and Melox sites in France.

Engineering
Orano provides nuclear fuel cycle engineering services through its subsidiary Orano Projects. Its engineering sites are located in Equeurdreville, Saint-Quentin-en-Yvelines, and Bagnols-sur-Cèze, France. The subsidiary Orano Temis is involved in mechanical engineering and manufactures special equipment, relating to the nuclear fuel cycle, as well as serving external customers in the aerospace and defense sectors. In at least one case Orano has been contracted for feasibility studies.

Nuclear medicine
Orano's subsidiary Orano Med deals with nuclear medicine, including the development of therapies to fight cancer. It has laboratories in Bessines-sur-Gartempe, France, and Plano, Texas, United States.

See also

 European Atomic Energy Community
 World Nuclear Industry Status Report

References

External links
 

Areva
Companies based in Paris
Energy companies established in 2017
Non-renewable resource companies established in 2017
Conglomerate companies of France
Manufacturing companies of France
Uranium mining companies of France
Multinational companies headquartered in France
Nuclear fuel companies
Nuclear technology companies of France
Government-owned companies of France